Parit Unas is a fishing village in Muar District, Johor, Malaysia. This village is located about 2 km from Parit Bakar town.

References

Muar District
Towns, suburbs and villages in Muar